Gallacetophenone is the acetyl derivative of pyrogallol.  It can be synthesized from pyrogallol using zinc chloride and acetic anhydride.

References

Aromatic ketones
Pyrogallols